{{Infobox college football bowl game
| name               = Cheez-It Bowl<small></small>
| full_name          =
| nickname           = 
| logo               =Cheez-It Bowl Logo.png 
| caption            = 
| stadium            = Camping World Stadium
| previous_stadiums  = Joe Robbie Stadium (1990–2000)
| location           = Orlando, Florida
| previous_locations = Miami Gardens, Florida (1990–2000)
| years              = 1990–present
| champ_affiliation  = Bowl Coalition (1992)
| conference_tie-ins = ACC, Big 12
| previous_tie-ins   = Big Ten, Big East
| payout             = 6,071,760 (2019)
| sponsors           = 
| former_names       = 
| prev_matchup_year  = 2021
| prev_matchup_season= 2021
| prev_matchup_teams = Clemson vs. Iowa State
| prev_matchup_score = Clemson 20–13
| next_matchup_year  = 2022
| next_matchup_season= 2022
| next_matchup_teams = Florida State vs. Oklahoma
| next_matchup_date  = Florida State 35–32
}}

The Cheez-It Bowl is an annual college football bowl game that is played in Orlando, Florida, at Camping World Stadium. The bowl is operated by Florida Citrus Sports, a non-profit group which also organizes the Citrus Bowl and the Florida Classic. It was first played in 1990 in Miami Gardens, Florida, before moving to Orlando in 2001. Originally commissioned as the Sunshine Classic'', it has undergone several name changes. The game currently has tie-ins with the Atlantic Coast Conference (ACC) and Big 12 Conference. In the new College Football Playoff era, the bowl will match the top selection from the ACC (inclusive of Notre Dame) outside of the CFP series against the second selection from the Big 12 outside of the CFP series. However, in 2022, the Cheez-It Bowl jumped over the 2nd-7th big 12 selections to pick the 8th place Oklahoma Sooners.

History
The bowl was founded in 1990 by Raycom and was originally played at Joe Robbie Stadium outside the city of Miami. It was formed under the name Sunshine Football Classic, but due to corporate title sponsorships, was never actually contested under this name, nor even referred to as such except during brief intervals between corporate sponsors.  During its Miami existence, it successively went by the names Blockbuster Bowl (three editions), CarQuest Bowl (five editions), and the MicronPC Bowl (three editions).

In 2001, the bowl changed hands, and was relocated to Orlando. The bowl was known as the Tangerine Bowl, a historical moniker that was the original title of the game now known as the Citrus Bowl, for three playings. Foot Locker, the parent company of Champs Sports, purchased naming rights in 2004, naming it the Champs Sports Bowl, under which eight games were played. In early 2012, naming rights were agreed to by Russell Athletic; five games were played as the Russell Athletic Bowl. In early 2017, Camping World signed an agreement to be the title sponsor of the game through 2019; three editions were staged as the Camping World Bowl, concluding with the 30th playing of the bowl. In May 2020, Kellogg's signed on as the new title sponsor of the game in a multi-year agreement, placing its Cheez-It brand of snack crackers in the title position.

Miami
What is now the Cheez-It Bowl was sprung from a desire to hold a second bowl game in the Miami area. It would be an accompaniment to the long-established and well-known Orange Bowl, and would showcase the brand new stadium in the area that was built in 1987. The Orange Bowl game was still being played in the aging old stadium, whereas this new game would be played in the new stadium.

Miami Dolphins owner Wayne Huizenga quickly joined forces with bowl organizers and brought in Blockbuster Video, which he owned at the time, as title sponsor. The inaugural game, played on December 28, 1990, pitted Florida State and Penn State, and two legendary coaches, Bobby Bowden versus Joe Paterno in front of over 74,000 at Joe Robbie Stadium. Subsequent games, however, never matched the success of the first, even though the bowl was moved to the more prestigious New Year's Day slot starting in 1993.

In 1994, CarQuest Auto Parts became the title sponsor after Huizenga sold Blockbuster Video to Viacom. The New Year's Day experiment was short lived as the organizers of the more established Orange Bowl received permission to move their game into Joe Robbie Stadium beginning in 1996. That bumped the Carquest Bowl back to the less-desirable December date. After the 2000 playing, Florida Citrus Sports took over the game and moved it to Orlando.

Before gaining Blockbuster Entertainment as the corporate sponsor for the inaugural event, the game was tentatively referred to as the Sunshine Classic.

Orlando

From 2006 to 2010, the bowl matched teams from the Atlantic Coast Conference (ACC) and the Big Ten Conference. Under the terms of a television deal signed with ESPN in 2006, the bowl was to be held after Christmas Day from 2006 onward, and be shown on ESPN in prime time. The change was made to move the game from the less-desirable pre-Christmas date utilized from 2001 to 2004.

From 2005 to 2009, the stadium faced challenges in preparing the stadium for two bowl games in less than one week (the Citrus Bowl is traditionally held New Year's Day). This was also in part due to the Florida high school football championship games being held at the stadium shortly before the bowls. In 2009, rainy weather turned the stadium's grass field into a muddly, sloppy, quagmire for both bowl games. In 2010, the stadium switched to artificial turf, facilitating the quick turnaround necessary.

In 2009, the bowl announced that the Big East was to be one of the tie-in conferences for four years starting in 2010, with the bowl having the option of selecting Notre Dame once during the four years.  In October 2009, the bowl announced that they had extended their agreement with the ACC for the same term.  The game would match the third pick from the ACC against the second selection from the Big East. The previous agreement had matched the 4th pick from the ACC against the 4th or 5th pick from the Big Ten. ACC and Big East teams subsequently met in the 2010 through 2013 games, except for 2011 when Notre Dame was selected (as permitted in the agreement with the Big East) and in 2013 when the Louisville Cardinals of the American Athletic Conference were selected ("The American" became the football successor to the Big East in 2013).

Since 2014, the game features the second pick from the ACC after the New Year's Six bowls make their picks—usually the losing team from the ACC Football Championship Game, or one of the division runners-up—against the third pick from the Big 12.

Game results

All rankings are taken from the AP Poll prior to the game being played.

Source:
Games 1–11 played in Miami Gardens, Florida
Games 12–present played in Orlando, Florida

MVPs

Most appearances
Updated through the December 2022 edition (33 games, 66 total appearances).

Teams with multiple appearances

Teams with a single appearance
Won (9): Alabama, Baylor, Illinois, Louisville, Maryland, Pittsburgh, South Carolina, Stanford, Texas Tech

Lost (6): Arkansas, Kansas, Michigan State, Minnesota, Purdue, Rutgers

Appearances by conference
Updated through the December 2022 edition (33 games, 66 total appearances).

 Games marked with an asterisk (*) were played in January of the following calendar year.
 The American record includes appearances of the Big East Conference, as The American retains the charter of the original Big East, following its 2013 realignment. Teams representing the Big East appeared in nine games, compiling a 4–5 record.
 The Big Eight Conference dissolved after the 1995 season.
 Independents: Penn State (1990, 1992), Florida State (1990), Notre Dame (2011, 2019)

Game records

Source:

Media coverage

The bowl was televised by Raycom in its inaugural year, followed by CBS Sports (four editions), TBS (six editions), and ESPN since 2001.

Notes

References

Further reading

External links
 

 
College football bowls
American football in Orlando, Florida
Recurring sporting events established in 1990
1990 establishments in Florida